Acanthobasidium is a genus of fungi in the Stereaceae family. The genus, which contains three species found in Europe, was circumscribed by mycologist Franz Oberwinkler in 1966.

References

Russulales genera
Stereaceae
Taxa named by Franz Oberwinkler
Taxa described in 1966